Yitzhak Arieli (born 1896, died 5 April 1974) was a leading Israeli rabbi.

Biography
Arieli was born in 1896 in the Old City of Jerusalem, which was then part of the Ottoman Empire, and studied at Torat Hayim and Etz Chaim yeshivot in Jerusalem.

He was one of the founders of Kiryat Shmuel and Neve Sha'anan neighborhoods in central Jerusalem. He was also the spiritual leader of the Knesset Yisrael neighborhood, where he resided.

Arieli developed a close relationship with Rav Kook following the latter's arrival in Jerusalem in 1921, and became one of his leading students.

Arieli was appointed as posek of Bikur Holim Hospital and served as the mashgiach ruchani of Jerusalem's Mercaz HaRav Yeshiva.

His grandson Asher Arieli is a senior lecturer at Yeshivas Mir. His granddaughter Yael Willner is a judge on the Supreme Court of Israel.

Awards and honours
 In 1966, Rabbi Arieli was awarded the Israel Prize, in Rabbinical literature.
 There is a street named after Rabbi Arieli in Beitar Illit, and in the Nachlaot neighborhood of Jerusalem there is a street name after the title of one of his books "Anayim Lemishpat".

Published works
 Anayim Lemishpat
 Shirat Hage'ulah - on the Passover Hagadah
 Midrash Arieli

See also
List of Israel Prize recipients

References

Religious Zionist Orthodox rabbis
1896 births
1974 deaths
Israeli Jews
Rabbis in Jerusalem
Israel Prize Rabbi recipients
Israel Prize in Rabbinical literature recipients
Jews in Mandatory Palestine
Jews in Ottoman Palestine